Bekdoolot Rasulbekov (born 1996) is a Kyrgyzstani weightlifter. He won the bronze medal in the men's 102 kg event at the 2021 Islamic Solidarity Games held in Konya, Turkey. He represented Kyrgyzstan at the 2020 Summer Olympics in Tokyo, Japan. He competed in the men's 96kg event.

Career 

He represented Kyrgyzstan at the 2018 Asian Games held in Jakarta, Indonesia in the men's 94kg event. In 2019, he competed in the men's 96kg event at the World Weightlifting Championships held in Pattaya, Thailand.

In 2021, he competed at the 2020 Asian Weightlifting Championships held in Tashkent, Uzbekistan. He finished in 4th place in the men's 102kg event at the 2021 World Weightlifting Championships held in Tashkent, Uzbekistan.

He won the silver medal in his event at the 2022 Asian Weightlifting Championships held in Manama, Bahrain. He won the bronze medal in the men's 102kg Clean & Jerk event at the 2022 World Weightlifting Championships held in Bogotá, Colombia.

Achievements

References

External links 
 

Living people
1996 births
Kyrgyzstani male weightlifters
Weightlifters at the 2018 Asian Games
Asian Games competitors for Kyrgyzstan
Weightlifters at the 2020 Summer Olympics
Olympic weightlifters of Kyrgyzstan
People from Jalal-Abad Region
Islamic Solidarity Games competitors for Kyrgyzstan
Islamic Solidarity Games medalists in weightlifting
21st-century Kyrgyzstani people